Arauzo de Miel is a municipality and town located in the province of Burgos, Castile and León, Spain. According to the 2004 census (INE), the municipality had a population of 363 inhabitants.

The municipality of Arauzo de Miel is made up of two towns: Arauzo de Miel (seat or capital) and Doña Santos.

References 

Municipalities in the Province of Burgos